Allen Kent Johnston (born February 21, 1956) is an American football coach.

Career
Johnston served as an assistant coach at Northwestern State University from 1979 to 1980, the Northeast Louisiana University from 1980 to 1981, and the University of Alabama from 1983 to 1986. He served as Strength and Conditioning Coach of the Tampa Bay Buccaneers from 1987 to 1991, the Green Bay Packers from 1992 to 1998, and the Seattle Seahawks from 1999 to 2003 before returning to the University of Alabama. Later he was hired as the Strength and Conditioning Coach of the Cleveland Browns. In 1997 while with the Packers he was named Strength and Conditioning Coach of the Year.

Johnston attended Stephen F. Austin State University where he played defensive back on the football team.

References

Cleveland Browns coaches
Alabama Crimson Tide football coaches
Seattle Seahawks coaches
Green Bay Packers coaches
Tampa Bay Buccaneers coaches
Louisiana–Monroe Warhawks football coaches
Northwestern State Demons football coaches
American strength and conditioning coaches
Stephen F. Austin Lumberjacks football players
1956 births
Living people